Judith and Holofernes is a tempera painting by the Italian Renaissance artist Andrea Mantegna, painted about 1495, depicting the common subject in art of Judith beheading Holofernes.

History
The painting has been dated through comparison with similar grisaille panels with Old Testament subjects, produced by Mantegna around 1495 and 1500.

The work was perhaps included in the Gonzaga collection acquired by Charles I of England in 1628. Given to William Herbert,  6th Earl of  Pembroke, it was inherited by his heirs until it was sold in London in 1917. After a series of different owners, it was acquired in New York City by Joseph E. Widener in 1923. In 1942, it was donated to the National Gallery of Art in Washington, DC.

Description
In a relatively serene interpretation of the theme, Judith is portrayed standing under the pink tent of Holofernes (whose foot can be seen on the right) immediately after beheading him, still holding the blade. She is dropping the head into a sack held by a maid.

The panel has brilliant and variegated colors, resembling a miniature. The ground, painted in diagonal perspective, is composed of stone and earth slabs, some of which are out of  position. It is painted with tempera with gold and silver.

References

Bibliography
 La Grande Storia dell'Arte - Il Quattrocento, Il Sole 24 Ore, 2005
 Kleiner, Frank S. Gardner's Art Through the Ages, 13th edition, 2008
 Manca, Joseph. Andrea Mantegna and the Italian Renaissance, 2006

External links
Page at the Museum's website

 

1495 paintings
Paintings by Andrea Mantegna
Collections of the National Gallery of Art
Paintings depicting Judith
Paintings about death
Christian art about death
Gonzaga art collection